Hans Carl Ludwig Augustinsson (born 21 April 1994) is a Swedish professional footballer who plays as a left-back for La Liga club Mallorca, on loan from La Liga club Sevilla, and the Sweden national team.

A product of Brommapojkarna's academy, he played two senior seasons with the club before leaving for IFK Göteborg in 2013. With an injury-filled first year, his breakthrough had to wait until the 2014 season, in which he was named the best left back of the campaign. A move to Copenhagen followed in January 2015 for an estimated record fee of €1.4 million. He has ended up being club champion twice, with Copenhagen in the 2015–16 season and 2016–17 season, and runner-up three times with his teams; in Superettan 2012, Allsvenskan 2014 and in the 2014–15 Danish Superliga. He won one domestic cup title with IFK Göteborg 2012–13 and three consecutive domestic cup titles with Copenhagen in 2014–15, 2015–16 and 2016–17.

Augustinsson was part of the Sweden under-21 squad that qualified and later won the European U21 Championship in 2015, playing all five games in the main tournament and scoring in the penalty shoot-out against Portugal in the final. He made his first appearance for the senior national team in January 2015, and was part of Sweden's Euro 2016, 2018 FIFA World Cup, and Euro 2020 squads.

Club career

IF Brommapojkarna
Augustinsson started his football career at age six with Stockholm side IF Brommapojkarna. He was notable throughout his youth years, being the captain for the team's U17 squad and having trials with clubs such as Borussia Mönchengladbach and Sampdoria. After advancing through the youth ranks, he earned a spot in the first team as a 16-year-old in 2011 and made his debut in Superettan later that year. With four appearances in his debut season, including his senior debut in the domestic cup, he came to play almost every game the following year, ending up with two goals and four assists. With two senior seasons and 30 league games for Brommapojkarna, Augustinsson moved to IFK Göteborg in January 2013, turning down offers from several other professional clubs.

IFK Göteborg
The move to top team IFK Göteborg went well and Augustinsson played most of the games during the pre-season. When Svenska Cupen began in March, he was first-choice as left-back and played two games in the group stage. IFK Göteborg later won the cup against Djurgården in the final. Just a couple of weeks before the start of 2013 Allsvenskan, he picked up a knee injury while playing for Sweden under-21s, which kept him out of action for five months. On his Allsvenskan debut on 25 August 2013 in an away match against Malmö FF he suffered another injury, which meant that he would be out for the rest of the season.

Augustinsson came back from his second injury in time for the first competitive match in 2014, against Värnamo in Svenska Cupen in early March. He scored his first goal in Allsvenskan on 24 September in the 2014 season, when IFK Göteborg won away against Örebro SK by 4–3. He played 28 league games that season, without being substituted, and assisted for three goals.
He later earned a spot in Allsvenskan's Team of the Year 2014 – voted by supporters of the SvenskaFans.com website.

Copenhagen
Augustinsson transferred to F.C. Copenhagen on 5 January 2015 after signing a 4.5-year contract on 6 June 2014. The deal was made so he could be the replacement for Pierre Bengtsson at the left-back position when Bengtsson's contract ended with Copenhagen on 31 December 2014. The transfer fee was estimated at 13 million SEK (approximately €1.4 million), which made him the most expensive wing-back ever bought from Sweden.

2014–15 season
Having played every exhibition game during the winter break for Copenhagen, Augustinsson made his Superliga-debut against Vestsjælland when the season restarted in February. He assisted the first goal of the game and scored later himself, playing a key role in the team's 2–0 victory. Ekstra Bladet described it as "the dream debut" and manager Ståle Solbakken said it was the best debut since his own debut for Copenhagen against rivals Brøndby back in the year 2000.

He came to play 15 league games during the spring season, helping the team reach the second place in the league. He was noted for six assists, which placed him third in the assist-table and which made him the defender with the most assists of the 2014–15 season – despite playing less than half of the games. Defensively Copenhagen only conceded goals in six games, with many experts claiming that he was one of the best players of the spring season.

Augustinsson played regularly in the Danish Cup as well throughout the spring, and scored a match winning 1–0 goal from a free kick against Esbjerg in the second game of the semifinals. Copenhagen later won the final in May against Vestsjælland, with him providing an assist in the team's 3–2 win. The cup win was his second title of his career and his first for the club.

2015–16 season
The 2015–16 season was Augustinsson's most successful season in his career, winning his first domestic league title and securing his third domestic cup victory. Being rumored with moves to top teams, such as Liverpool, after winning the 2015 UEFA European Under-21 Championship, Augustinsson stayed in Denmark and played his first complete season for Copenhagen.

In the league, Augustinsson played every minute of the first 30 games, until he was rested for the final two away games when the trophy was already secured in the middle of May. He assisted to nine goals throughout the campaign, placing him as tied leader with Nicolaj Thomsen and Rasmus Falk. Ekstra Bladet ranked him as one of the five best players for Copenhagen, awarding 5 of 6 stars for his performance, citing an improvement compared to the spring part of the season.

2016–17 season
During the Copenhagen derby at Brøndby on 17 April 2017, Augustinsson had dead rats thrown at him by home supporters as he prepared to take a corner kick. Play was stopped and Copenhagen players attempted to kick the rats off the pitch before stewards arrived to pick up the rodents.

Werder Bremen
On 30 January 2017, Werder Bremen announced the signing of Augustinsson for the forthcoming 2017–18 Bundesliga season. In August 2018, upon his return from holidays after the 2018 FIFA World Cup, he agreed a contract extension with Werder Bremen.

On 6 July 2020, Werder Bremen played 1. FC Heidenheim in the second leg of the Bundesliga relegation playoff, having tied the first leg 0–0. In the 90+4th minute, Augustinsson scored to give Werder Bremen a 2–1 lead. They match ended 2–2, and Bremen stayed in the Bundesliga on away goals.

Sevilla
Augustinsson moved to La Liga club Sevilla in August 2021.

Loan to Aston Villa 
On 11 July 2022, Augustinsson joined Premier League club Aston Villa on a season-long loan, with the English club having the option to make the transfer permanent at the end of the loan. Augustinsson made his debut for Aston Villa on 2 October 2022, an away Premier League draw against Leeds United, starting the match due to an injury to Lucas Digne. Augustinsson himself, however, would suffer a hamstring injury in the first half of the match and was substituted.

International career

Youth national teams
Augustinsson represented Sweden under-17s and the under-19s 21 times between 2009 and 2013. He has made 19 caps for Sweden under-21s since 2012 and is still eligible to play for the team. His biggest success came for the under-21 team, when they manage to qualify to the 2015 UEFA European Under-21 Championship and later win the tournament, whilst being a key player in Håkan Ericson's squad.

In 2016, Augustinsson was denied joining Sweden under-23s squad for the 2016 Olympics in August by his club Copenhagen.

European U21 Championship

Sweden managed to qualify to the European U21 Championship in Czech Republic for the first time since 2004 after a successful qualification. In an exhibition game against Portugal U21 in early 2013, Augustinsson injured his knee and was later out for the rest of the year, which meant he missed most of the qualification games. He was however Håkan Ericson's first choice at the left-back position when he was available and was part of the squad in the games of 2014.

Augustinsson played every game in the group stage of the main tournament. Before the second game against England, in which Sweden lost, interest from Liverpool was reported.

Sweden however managed to advance from the group, thanks to winning against Italy and drawing against Portugal. After knocking out Denmark in the semi-final by 4–1, Sweden were to play Portugal again in the final. In a goalless match, the first kept clean sheet of Sweden in the tournament, the final had to be decided by a penalty shoot-out. Augustinsson scored his penalty and Sweden won by 4–3. He received international praise for his final performance, described as "outstanding". He earned a spot in The Guardian's 'Team of the Tournament'.

Senior national team
Augustinsson debuted with the senior team in January 2015, when he started both games in their friendlies against the Ivory Coast and Finland. Sportbladet rated him as the best Swedish player of those two games.

He received his second call-up in March 2016, playing 90 minutes in Sweden's 2–1 loss against Turkey. On 11 May, Erik Hamrén announced that Augustinsson was going to feature the Euro 2016 squad.

2016–present
He remained as unused substitute, behind Martin Olsson, throughout Sweden's disappointing group stage at Euro 2016. Following Hamréns resignation and Janne Andersson's arrival later that summer, Augustinsson got bigger competition when Oscar Wendt re-joined the squad after conflicts with the former head coach. With Andersson's experimenting of the two veterans at the left-back position in the beginning of the World Cup qualification, Augustinsson opened possibilities to join the Sweden under-21 squad, for which he still was eligible to play. Andersson however kept him in the senior squad and Augustinsson came to play the final 30 minutes against Bulgaria in the qualifier in October.

In May 2018 he was named in Sweden's 23-man squad for the 2018 FIFA World Cup in Russia.

Style of play
Augustinsson is often referred as a modern wing-back, whose qualities is in his offense, possession, pace and a good left foot. He started out as a central midfielder, but changed position to left-back at age eleven due to tough competition in the midfield. He has always been a specialist in set pieces and takes a lot of corners and freekicks. His role models on the football pitch is former left back Gareth Bale and David Alaba.

Personal life
Ludwig is the firstborn and grew up in a sports-oriented family in the central parts of Stockholm. His father Hans played football in Swedish Division 1 and his mother Elisabeth played volleyball on an international level for Sweden. His younger brother Jonathan Augustinsson also plays professional football as a left-back.

The family was part of a nationwide debate in the summer of 2015, about more Swedish national players coming from well-educated families in wealthier neighborhoods. Critics have stated that players like Augustinsson are successful today because of the amount of money the families invest in private training sessions.

Together with his good friends and former teammates from his time in Brommapojkarna, John Guidetti and Simon Tibbling, he is a teetotaler and has never been drunk. Ludwig attended primary schools Aspuddens skola and Nybohovsskolan, both with focus on football.

Although he has been playing football his entire life, he tried out ice hockey in his youth and was part of AIK IF. He is a lifelong supporter of Manchester United and dreams of playing for the club one day.

Modeling
In December 2015, Augustinsson featured in NLY Man's Christmas campaign "The Next Generation".

Career statistics

Club

International

Scores and results list Sweden's goal tally first, and the score column indicates the score after each Augustinsson goal.

Honours
IFK Göteborg
Svenska Cupen: 2012–13

Copenhagen
Danish Superliga: 2015–16, 2016–17
Danish Cup: 2014–15, 2015–16, 2016–17

Sweden U21
UEFA European Under-21 Championship: 2015

References

External links

 
  (archive)
 
 Ludwig Augustinsson at FC Copenhagen
 

Living people
1994 births
Footballers from Stockholm
Swedish footballers
Association football defenders
Sweden international footballers
Sweden youth international footballers
Sweden under-21 international footballers
UEFA Euro 2016 players
2018 FIFA World Cup players
UEFA Euro 2020 players
Superettan players
Allsvenskan players
Danish Superliga players
Bundesliga players
La Liga players
Premier League players
IF Brommapojkarna players
IFK Göteborg players
F.C. Copenhagen players
SV Werder Bremen players
Sevilla FC players
Aston Villa F.C. players
RCD Mallorca players
Swedish expatriate footballers
Swedish expatriate sportspeople in Denmark
Expatriate men's footballers in Denmark
Swedish expatriate sportspeople in Germany
Expatriate footballers in Germany
Swedish expatriate sportspeople in Spain
Expatriate footballers in Spain
Swedish expatriate sportspeople in England
Expatriate footballers in England